Amber Run is a British indie rock band from Nottingham, UK composed of Joshua "Joe" Keogh, Tom Sperring, and Henry Wyeth. The band have released three full-length albums. three mini-albums and five EPs. Initially called Amber, they later changed their name to avoid conflict with the German dance-pop singer of same name.

History

Formation
Joshua Keogh, Tom Sperring and Will Jones were originally friends from Buckinghamshire at Dr Challoner's Grammar School where they played in an alt rock band. With Felix Archer from the same area and Wyeth from Kent, they met while studying at University of Nottingham. They all studied for degrees in Humanities and Law, but abandoned their studies in second year to focus on the band. Keogh initially performed under his own name and started to get 'a bit of momentum [so] we sat down and jammed out one day and there was something about it. It was so much better than what I was doing solo, so we started a band'.

Thanks to local BBC presenter Dean Jackson the band featured on the BBC Introducing stage at Reading Festival in 2013 was only the fourth show the band played. Their presence attracted a number of A&R men to the show and after a few weeks of negotiating the band signed to RCA.

2014–2015: Noah and debut album
On 14 February 2014, they released their first EP, Noah, which consisted of 4 songs. Two months later, after supporting Kodaline on their March 2014 tour, they released their second EP, titled Spark, on 18 April 2014. Their third EP, Pilot, was released on 19 September 2014.

In March 2014, the band announced they had been recording their debut album throughout January and February, with Mike Crossey and Sam Winfield, "who's in many ways the sixth member of our band".

In July and August 2014 the band released videos for the single "I Found" and "Pilot", respectively, that are a duology. Speaking to LeftLion Magazine in December 2014, they explained: "We were already discussing what to do with it [I Found]; it's not a song that screams "single" but we wanted to release it in some form. Releasing it with "Pilot" just seemed to be a good method to bring attention to the whole EP, and doing something creative with the videos is a bit more interesting. Linking the videos gives you more scope... [to] expand the storyline past three and a half minutes."

On 1 December 2014, Amber Run announced their new single, "Just My Soul Responding". The song was confirmed as the lead single taken from the band's upcoming debut. In regards to their debut album, frontman Joshua Keogh said the "album is done and we've signed it off. Now it's deciding the best time to get them out" The video for "Just My Soul Responding" was uploaded on 18 December 2014. The single was released on 5 January 2015.

Their debut album, 5am was released on 20 April 2015. Felix Archer departed the band in early 2016. On 15 April 2016, the band released a new single "Haze".

2016-2018: For a Moment, I Was Lost and The Assembly
In 2016, the band released "Stranger" as the first single from their second album, For a Moment, I Was Lost. A second single titled "Perfect" was released in February 2017. The album was released digitally on 10 February, with a physical release scheduled for 17 March. Later, the band released two singles, titled "The Weight" and "Heaven is a Place" on 16 March 2018 and 13 April 2018 respectively. On 11 May 2018, The Assembly was released as an EP, which contained the two aforementioned singles and another, titled "Amen." Another rendition of Amen was released as part of the EP which featured London Contemporary Voices.

2019 - present: Philophobia, unplugged EP, mini-album trilogy and How to Be Human (2023)
Between November 2018 and September 2019, Amber Run released five singles, "Carousel", "Affection", "Neon Circus", "The Darkness Has a Voice" and "What Could Be as Lonely as Love", preceding the release of their third album, Philiophobia, on 27 September 2019. On 26 June 2020, they released an unplugged EP, featuring 6 songs from Philophobia. On 4 November 2021, they released a new mini-album, The Search (Act I), the first in a trilogy of mini-albums that would be released throughout the following year. The Start (Act II), the second in the trilogy, was released on 3 June 2022. On 22 July, a new single, "Cradle" was released, followed by "Funeral" on 2 September, concluding with the release of the third and final mini-album in the trilogy, The Hurt (Act III) on 2 November. Following this release, Amber Run announced that their upcoming full-length album, How to Be Human, is scheduled for release in Spring 2023, with a coinciding UK tour running between 13 - 20 April 2023.

Members
Joshua Keogh – vocals, guitar
Tom Sperring – bass guitar
Henry Wyeth – keys

Former Members
Will Jones - guitar
Felix Archer - drums

Discography

Studio albums

Extended plays

Singles

References

External links

English indie rock groups
Musical groups established in 2012
Vocal quintets
Musical groups from Nottingham
RCA Records artists
Sony Music artists
2012 establishments in England